Ryan Drew Thomas (born November 5, 1984) is a black belt under Ricardo Liborio and an American mixed martial artist who most recently competed in the Middleweight division. He has a degree from Eastern Illinois University in elementary education. He also wrestled at Eastern Illinois University.

Mixed martial arts Career
Ryan started his career at middleweight (185 pounds), but dropped to welterweight (170 pounds) after only a few fights.

Ryan has fought for the Ultimate Fighting Championships, Bellator Fighting Championships, Courage Fighting Championships, Dragons Cage, Genesis MMA, Colosseum Combat, World Fighting Championships, and he also won the "Iowa Meanest Man Tournament" (a sixteen-man tournament) in Davenport, Iowa.

Ultimate Fighting Championship
On August 9, 2008, Thomas made his UFC debut at UFC 87 against Ben Saunders, losing via submission in round two.

His next fight was against TUF Alumni Matt Brown at UFC 91, again, losing via submission in round two. He was then cut from the promotion.

Bellator Fighting Championships
In April 2010, Thomas signed with upstart promotion Bellator Fighting Championships. He took part in the promotions Season Two Welterweight Tournament, losing to Ben Askren in a Quarterfinal bout via stoppage in the first round.

After Jim Wallhead was pulled from the tournament, Thomas was given another Quarterfinal bout at Bellator 15 against Jacob McClintock, Thomas defeated McClintock by TKO in the first round to receive a rematch with Askren.

On May 20, 2010, Thomas got a rematch with Ben Askren in a Semifinal bout at Bellator 19, Thomas lost via unanimous decision with all three judges scoring the contest 30-27 in favor of Askren.

Thomas eventually faced Jim Wallhead on October 14, 2010 at Bellator 32 He lost the fight via unanimous decision.

Championships and accomplishments
Colosseum Combat
CC Welterweight Championship (Two time)
Interim CC Welterweight Championship (One time)

Courage Fighting Championships
CFC Welterweight Championship (One time)

Mixed martial arts record

|-
|Win
|align=center|20–8
|Roger Carroll
|Decision (unanimous)
|Ring of Dreams: Fight Night 16
|
|align=center|3
|align=center|5:00
|Winston-Salem, North Carolina, United States
|
|-
|Win
|align=center|19–8
|William Hill
|TKO (doctor stoppage)
|Hoosier Fight Club 23
|
|align=center|3
|align=center|4:35
|Valparaiso, Indiana, United States
|Returned to Middleweight.
|-
|Win
|align=center|18–8
|Joshua Thorpe
|TKO (punches)
|Colosseum Combat 30
|
|align=center|1
|align=center|4:06
|Kokomo, Indiana, United States
|
|-
|Loss
|align=center|17–8
|Dominique Steele
|Decision (unanimous)
|XFC 27: Frozen Fury
|
|align=center|3
|align=center|5:00
|Muskegon, Michigan, United States
|
|-
|Win
|align=center|17–7
|Rocky France
|Submission (triangle choke)
|XFC 25: Boiling Point
|
|align=center|2
|align=center|1:27
|Albuquerque, New Mexico, United States
|
|-
|Win
|align=center|16–7
|Rocky France 
|TKO (retirement)
|Colosseum Combat 25
|
|align=center|3
|align=center|5:00
|Kokomo, Indiana, United States
|
|-
|Win
|align=center|15–7
|Corey Hill
|Submission (armbar)
|XFC 21: Night of Champions 2
|
|align=center|1
|align=center|2:34
|Nashville, Tennessee, United States
|
|-
|Win
|align=center|14–7
|Evilasio Silva Araujo
|Submission (punches) 
|AF - Arena Fight Mossoro
|
|align=center|1
|align=center|2:30
|Rio Grande do Norte, Brazil
|
|-
|-
|Win
|align=center|13–7
|John Kolosci
|Submission (reverse triangle choke)
|XFC 15: Tribute
|
|align=center|1
|align=center|4:46
|Tampa, Florida, United States
|
|-
|Loss
|align=center|12–7
|Jonatas Novaes
|Submission (armbar)
|Combat USA
|
|align=center| 1
|align=center| 4:08
|Racine, Wisconsin, United States
|
|-
|Win
|align=center|12–6
|Daniel Head
|Submission (triangle choke)
|Colosseum Combat 16
|
|align=center|1
|align=center|2:04
|Kokomo, Indiana, United States
|
|-
|-
|Loss
|align=center|11–6
|Jim Wallhead
|Decision (unanimous)
|Bellator 32
|
|align=center|3
|align=center|5.00
|Kansas City, Missouri, United States
|
|-
|Loss
|align=center|11–5
|Ben Askren
|Decision (unanimous)
|Bellator 19
|
|align=center|3
|align=center|5:00
|Grand Prairie, Texas, United States
|
|-
|Win
|align=center|11–4
|Jacob McClintock
|TKO (punches)
|Bellator 15
|
|align=center|1
|align=center|4:11
|Uncasville, Connecticut, United States
|
|-
|Loss
|align=center|10–4
|Ben Askren
|Technical Submission (guillotine choke)
|Bellator 14
|
|align=center|1
|align=center|2:40
|Chicago, Illinois, United States
|
|-
|Winx
|align=center|10–3
|Ryan Stout
|Submission (triangle choke)
|War in the Yard
|
|align=center|1
|align=center|1:57
|Anderson, Indiana, United States
|
|-
|Lossx
|align=center|9–3
|TaylorMatt Brown
|Submission (armbar)
|UFC 91
|
|align=center|2
|align=center|0:57
|Las Vegas, Nevada, United States
|
|-
|Lossx
|align=center|9–2
|TaylorBen Saunders
|Submission (armbar)
|UFC 87
|
|align=center|2
|align=center|2:28
|Minneapolis, Minnesota, United States
|
|-
|Winx
|align=center|9–1
|John McElroy
|Submission (triangle choke) 
|AFA: American Fighting Association
|
|align=center|1
|align=center|0:36
|Des Moines, Iowa, United States
|
|-
|Winx
|align=center|8–1
|Jason Holmes
|Submission (strikes)
|Courage Fighting Championships 11
|
|align=center|1
|align=center|2:15
|Champaign, Illinois, United States
|
|-
|Winx
|align=center|7–1
|Jason Bowling
|TKO (punches)
|Extreme Challenge 94
|
|align=center|1
|align=center|1:48
|Danville, Illinois, United States
|
|-
|Winx
|align=center|6–1
|Kenny Allen 
|Submission (triangle choke) 
|Extreme Challenge 89 
|
|align=center|1
|align=center|2:54 
|Decatur, Illinois, United States
|
|-
|Lossx
|align=center|5–1
|TaylorJesse Lennox
|Submission (armbar)
|Mainstream MMA - Cold War
|
|align=center|3
|align=center|2:03
|Cedar Rapids, Iowa, United States
|
|-
|Winx
|align=center|5–0
|Chris Bachmeir
|TKO (Punches)
|WFC - Downtown Throwdown 
|
|align=center|3
|align=center|1:06
|Minneapolis, Minnesota, United States
|
|-
|Winx
|align=center|4–0
|Walt Denim
|KO (punch)
|Courage Fighting Championships 9 
|
|align=center|1
|align=center|0:45
|Terre Haute, Indiana, United States
|
|-
|Winx
|align=center|3–0
|Tyler Anderson
|Submission
|MMA - Genesis 3 
|
|align=center|1
|align=center|0:50
|St. Charles, Missouri, United States
|
|-
|Winx
|align=center|2–0
|Kris Huffman
|TKO (punches)
|Courage Fighting Championships 8
|
|align=center|1
|align=center|1:16
|Decatur, Illinois, United States
|
|-
|Winx
|align=center|1–0
|Ron Wilson
|Submission (verbal)
|Dragons Cage - Marion 
|
|align=center|1
|align=center|1:56
|Marion, Illinois, United States
|

References

External links
 
 

1984 births
American male mixed martial artists
Mixed martial artists utilizing collegiate wrestling
Mixed martial artists utilizing Brazilian jiu-jitsu
American practitioners of Brazilian jiu-jitsu
People awarded a black belt in Brazilian jiu-jitsu
People from Danville, Illinois
Living people
People from Coconut Creek, Florida
Ultimate Fighting Championship male fighters
Eastern Illinois Panthers athletes
Mixed martial artists from Illinois